Ace Spectrum was an American R&B, soul and disco musical group that was popular in the mid-1970s.

History
Based in New York City, the group consisted of Rudy Gay Sr., Elliot Isaac, Henry "Easy" Zant, Aubrey "Troy" Johnson, and, on their final album, Frederick G. Duff and Lawrence Coley. Zant, (also known as Edward "Easy" Zant), was not only a member but he also managed the group. Gay, Isaac, Zant and Johnson began collaboration as a group in 1966.  "Don't Send Nobody Else", written by Ashford & Simpson, was their biggest single.  From their Tony Sylvester-produced debut album, it peaked at number 57 on Billboard's Hot 100 while finding its way to the top 20 on the R&B Singles chart. Their single "Keep Holdin' On" was released as a 12-inch single, and heavily promoted by their record label at disco clubs. Another single "Live and Learn" with lead vocals by Frederick, reached position 35 on the Dance Music/Club Play Singles chart. Their first two albums saw chart action. Inner Spectrum attained position 28 on the R&B Albums chart, and Low Rent Rendezvous saw action on the Billboard 200 (#138), as well as on R&B Albums (#35). Patrick Adams produced and arranged the group's 1976 recordings, but consequential success eluded them.

Style and influence
Ace Spectrum never developed into a huge hitmaker, although Allmusic considers it a "decent soul ensemble." Their recordings have generated considerable interest among Northern Soul collectors. The 1975 release "Keep Holding On" was one of the first 12-inch singles.  Musically, the group employed a mix of up-tempo and down-tempo songs.  The group eschewed the "high-voice technique" that was common for the era.  Backing strings were important to the group's sound.  Billboard commented positively about group, stating it deserved "as much exposure as possible." Rudy Gay Sr., a member of Iota Phi Theta fraternity, later went on to both father the famous basketball player and become music director for The Stylistics.

Discography

Singles

Albums

References

African-American musical groups
American soul musical groups
American rhythm and blues musical groups
Musical groups from New York City
Musical groups established in 1966
Atlantic Records artists
Musical quartets